Typhoon Rananim, known in the Philippines as Typhoon Karen, was the strongest typhoon to make landfall on the Chinese province of Zhejiang since 1956. It formed on August 6, 2004, intensifying into a tropical storm on August 8. Rananim gradually intensified, initially moving northward before turning to the northwest and attaining typhoon status. On August 12, Rananim moved ashore in China, and it dissipated three days later. The name Rananim means "hello" in the Chuukese language.

Impact outside of China was minimal and largely limited to heavy rains, although one death was reported in Taiwan. In the country, strong winds and heavy rainfall left heavy damage near the coast, as well as to farms further inland. Rananim destroyed 64,300 houses and damaged another 125,000. The typhoon affected 75 counties, affecting 18 million people, and overall damage was estimated at ¥20.1 billion ($2.44 billion 2004 USD, $  USD), primarily in Zhejiang. There were 168 deaths in China, which caused the name Rananim to be retired from the naming list.

Meteorological history

The origins of Typhoon Rananim were from an area of convection that persisted west-northwest of Guam in early August. The system tracked generally westward in an area of moderate wind shear, maintaining a weak circulation center. On August 6, the Japan Meteorological Agency (JMA) estimated the system developed into a tropical depression. Shortly before that time, the Philippine Atmospheric, Geophysical and Astronomical Services Administration (PAGASA) initiated advisories on the system, giving it the name Karen.

Further convective organization occurred as the circulation consolidated, and the Joint Typhoon Warning Center (JTWC) issued a Tropical Cyclone Formation Alert late on August 6. Subsequently, the depression maintained a northward track, due to its location along the northwest periphery of a near-equatorial ridge, as well as the presence of a tropical upper tropospheric trough. Although the circulation was broad, the winds intensified enough for the JMA to upgrade the depression to Tropical Storm Rananim on August 8.

Upon intensifying into a tropical storm, Rananim had a better-defined circulation than earlier in its duration; however, the convection was displaced from the center. The structure gradually organized, with increasing outflow and convective symmetry. On August 9, the storm turned toward the northwest due to a building ridge the northeast. Shortly thereafter, Rananim left the PAGASA area of warning responsibility.

After passing north of Taiwan, Rananim made landfall at peak intensity around 1300 UTC on August 12, near Wenling in Zhejiang province in China. The China Meteorological Administration reported that the typhoon was the strongest to hit Zhejiang since Typhoon Sally in 1956. Moving over land, the typhoon quickly weakened to tropical storm status as it turned toward the west. Early on August 13, the JMA downgraded Rananim to a tropical depression and issued the last warning; by that time, the circulation was over Jiangxi. The depression lasted another two days before dissipating over northwest Hunan.

Preparations and impact

After receiving heavy damage from Typhoon Mindulle a month earlier, residents in Taiwan prepared for Rananim by erecting sandbags along flood prone areas, while the Central Weather Bureau advised mariners to be on alert due to the storm. As it passed to the north of the country, the typhoon dropped moderate rainfall, reaching  in Hsinchu. There was one death on the island.

Prior to the typhoon's arrival in China, officials evacuated 467,900 people, many of them to government shelters across the region. It was estimated that about 30% of coastal houses were too weak to withstand the winds from the typhoon. In addition, officials ordered the closure of all restaurants and entertainment venues. Ferry service near Shanghai was disrupted, and 9,900 ships were moved to safer areas. In addition, several airports across the region were closed, including in Shanghai.

Rananim also produced strong winds as it moved through the region, with a record-breaking gust of  reported in the offshore Dachen Islands.

Upon moving ashore, Rananim destroyed hundreds of homes near the coast, with destroyed traffic signs and billboards, as well as widespread flooding. Strong winds caused widespread power outages and uprooted thousands of trees. About 64,300 houses were destroyed, and another 125,000 were damaged, leaving thousands of people homeless. Overall, the typhoon affected 75 counties, with 302 villages isolated due to high water. The combination of strong winds and flooding left heavy crop damage, killing 55,000 livestock, primarily cattle, and affecting  of fields; an estimated  of crops were destroyed. Further inland, the rains produced a landslide in Yueqing, which destroyed 52 houses and killed 25 people. Across the country, damage was estimated at ¥20.1 billion ($2.44 billion 2004 USD$,   USD), primarily in Zhejiang.

Overall, Rananim affected about 18 million people in China. A total of 3,321 people were injured, 185 of them seriously. By the day after Rananim moved ashore, the death toll was estimated at 29, although by the next day the total reached 115. Four days after landfall, there were 147 known deaths, which increased to 164 the following day. The final death toll was set at 168, although 24 people were missing as of the last count. Most of the deaths were from collapsed houses, with others due to flooding, landslides, or flying debris.

Aftermath
Immediately after Rananim dissipated, the government of China allocated ¥61 million ($7.4 million 2004 USD) for the affected people. Officials deployed over 200 members of the People's Liberation Army to assist in rescues. They used steel bars, ropes, and their hands to search through rubble for storm survivors. At the same time, utility crews worked to restore power and water in the affected areas. A few weeks after the typhoon, an earthquake and another typhoon struck the same region as Rananim had, creating additional flooding, damage, and deaths. The series of natural disasters stretched the resources of the local agencies, although the local Red Cross was still able to provide food, clothing, and blankets. The agency also launched appeals for additional relief supplies. A damaged school in Yueqing required additional buildings to be built for classes to resume by September. An estimated 85% of the destroyed homes were built before or during the 1980s, compared to 10% built in the 1990s. As a result, the government rebuilt homes across the affected area to higher building standards in order to mitigate future losses from typhoons.

Retirement
Due to the heavy damage in China, the name Rananim was retired during the 38th session of the Economic and Social Commission for Asia and the Pacific and World Meteorological Organization typhoon committee in November 2005; it was replaced with the name Fanapi. The name Fanapi was later also retired in 2010 and replaced with Rai. Rananim was the eighth Pacific typhoon to be retired.

See also

Typhoon Saomai
Typhoon Fitow
Typhoon Matsa

References

External links

JMA General Information of Typhoon Rananim (0413) from Digital Typhoon
JMA Best Track Data of Typhoon Rananim (0413) 
JMA Best Track Data (Graphics) of Typhoon Rananim (0413)
JMA Best Track Data (Text)
JTWC Best Track Data of Typhoon 16W (Rananim)
16W.RANANIM from the U.S. Naval Research Laboratory

2004 Pacific typhoon season
Retired Pacific typhoons
Typhoons
Typhoons in China
Rananim